Eudarcia jaworskii is a moth of the family Tineidae. It is found in Turkey.

The wingspan is about 6 mm. The forewings are dark grey-brown with a whitish pattern. The hindwings are light grey.

Etymology 
The species is named in honour Tomasz Jaworski, who collected the species.

References

Moths described in 2011
Meessiinae